This page lists the albums that reached number one on the Billboard Top R&B/Hip-Hop Albums and Top Rap Albums charts in 2005. The Rap Albums chart partially serves as a distillation of rap-specific titles from the overall R&B/Hip-Hop Albums chart.

Chart history

See also
2005 in music
2005 in hip hop music
List of number-one R&B singles of 2005 (U.S.)
List of Billboard 200 number-one albums of 2005

References 

2005
2005
United States RandB Hip Hop Albums